Johnny Lane Oates (January 21, 1946 – December 24, 2004) was an American professional baseball player, coach, and manager. During his playing career, Oates was a light-hitting player who was valued for his defensive skills and played most of his career as a reserve player. It was as a big league manager that Oates experienced his greatest success, when, under his leadership, the Texas Rangers won three American League Western Division titles.

Baseball playing career

Born in Sylva, North Carolina, Oates graduated from Prince George High School in Prince George, Virginia, before going on to Virginia Tech in Blacksburg. He was selected by the Baltimore Orioles as their first round pick in the 1967 Major League Baseball Secondary Draft.

Oates began his professional baseball career with the Bluefield Orioles, then the Miami Marlins in 1967 at the age of 21. After two seasons with Miami, Oates moved up to the Dallas–Fort Worth Spurs in 1969, where he hit for a .288 batting average in 66 games. He continued his climb up the minor league ladder in 1970, playing for the Triple-A Rochester Red Wings before making his major league debut with the Baltimore Orioles at the age of 24 on September 17, 1970. Oates was not on the post-season roster for The Orioles that won the 1970 World Series. Oates returned to the minor leagues in 1971, playing another season with Rochester, where he posted a .277 batting average along with a respectable .364 on-base percentage.

Oates was brought back up to the Orioles for the 1972 season, where he caught the majority of the Orioles' games. His defensive skills became apparent as he led American League catchers with a .995 fielding percentage. In a transaction primarily driven by the Orioles' need for a power-hitting catcher, Oates was traded along with Davey Johnson, Pat Dobson and Roric Harrison to the Atlanta Braves for Earl Williams and Taylor Duncan on the last day of the Winter Meetings on December 1, 1972. Oates spent two seasons with the Braves, platooning alongside Paul Casanova, then Vic Correll, before being traded to the Philadelphia Phillies in May 1975.

Oates had been designated to platoon at catcher with Bob Boone for the 1976 season; however, in the season-opening game against the Pittsburgh Pirates, he cracked his collar bone in a collision at home plate with Dave Parker and missed almost half the season. "That play changed my career", he said afterwards. He returned to help the Phillies win the 1976 National League Eastern Division pennant. Oates had one plate appearance, as a pinch hitter, in the 1976 National League Championship Series as the Phillies lost to the eventual world champion Cincinnati Reds. After the season, he was traded to the Los Angeles Dodgers on December 20, 1976.

With the Dodgers, Oates worked as a second-string catcher behind Steve Yeager and would once again reach the post-season as the Dodgers clinched the 1977 National League West title. The Dodgers went on to defeat the Philadelphia Phillies in the 1977 National League Championship Series before eventually losing to the New York Yankees in the 1977 World Series. In 1978, Oates appeared in only 40 games as the Dodgers repeated as Western Division champions and, once again defeated the Philadelphia Phillies in the 1978 National League Championship Series. The 1978 World Series was also a repeat of the previous year, as the Dodgers once again lost to the Yankees in a six-game series. Oates' playing time decreased further in 1979, as he appeared in only 26 games before being released at the end of the season. He became a free agent and signed a contract to play for the New York Yankees on April 4, 1980. Oates served as a backup to Rick Cerone during the 1980 season before playing in his final game on May 24, 1981, at the age of 35.

Managing
Oates began managing in baseball in 1982 when he guided the New York Yankees' Double-A Nashville Sounds to win the Southern League title. From 1984 to 1987, he worked as a coach for the Chicago Cubs and was credited with developing Jody Davis into a Gold Glove Award winning catcher. He rejoined the Orioles organization at their Rochester AAA affiliate in 1988. The following year, he was promoted to the majors where he worked as first base coach under Frank Robinson, and in 1991, after Robinson started 13–24, Oates was promoted to the manager of the Orioles. In his first full season with the team, Oates led the Orioles to an 89–73 record and then to an 85–77 record in 1993, which helped him to win The Sporting News Manager of the Year Award. However, following the strike-shortened 1994 season, Oates was dismissed by new owner Peter Angelos. He finished his Orioles managerial career with a record of 291 wins and 270 losses.

Despite being let go by the Orioles, Oates was quickly hired by the Texas Rangers, who had just fired their previous manager, Kevin Kennedy. Oates proceeded to lead the Rangers to their first playoff appearance in team history during the 1996 season. Despite the team's poor ERA (the team averaged 4.65 collectively), the Rangers' batting lineup was incredibly potent, featuring Iván Rodríguez, Will Clark, Mark McLemore, Dean Palmer, Rusty Greer, Juan González, and Mickey Tettleton; the team finished 90–72. Oates won the 1996 American League Manager of the Year Award that year, sharing honors with the Yankees' Joe Torre.

Oates continued to lead the Rangers for several more seasons, leading them to American League West titles in 1998 and 1999. However, the Rangers would win just one playoff game in that span (winning Game 1 of the 1996 American League Division Series), and the latter two ALDS appearances saw the Rangers score only one run each time, all at the hands of the New York Yankees, who won the World Series in those respective years. Oates' record of 1–9 (.100) is the worst for any manager with multiple postseason appearances.

Following a fourth-place finish in 2000 and beginning the 2001 season with an 11–17 record, Oates resigned as manager and third base coach Jerry Narron replaced him. Many fans, however, blamed Rangers management for the team's woes, saying that team management placed unreasonable expectations on Oates, especially after spending $252 million on free agent shortstop Alex Rodriguez. He finished his Rangers managerial career with a record of 506 wins and 476 losses.

Career statistics

Playing
In an 11-year major league career, Oates played in 593 games, accumulating 410 hits in 1,637 at bats for a .250 career batting average along with 14 home runs, 126 runs batted in and a .309 on-base percentage. A good defensive player, he ended his career with a .987 fielding percentage.

Managerial record

Honors

Oates was named American League Manager of the Year in 1996 when he led the Rangers to their first playoff berth in franchise history, winning the American League West Division.  He won the Sporting News American League Manager of the Year Award that year (and also when he was managing the Orioles in 1993).

His uniform number 26 was retired by the Rangers on August 5, 2005. It was only the second number retired by the Rangers, following the 34 of Nolan Ryan. During the 2005 season, a commemorative patch was worn on all Ranger uniforms and a sign was hung on the outfield wall in his honor. Prior to Game 3 of the 2010 American League Division Series against the Tampa Bay Rays, his eight-year-old grandson, Johnny Oates II, threw out the ceremonial first pitch.

Oates was posthumously inducted into the Baltimore Orioles Hall of Fame on August 7, 2010. That same year, Buck Showalter had honored his friend Oates by choosing the number '26' as he took over management of the Baltimore Orioles.

Oates was inducted into the Virginia Tech Sports Hall of Fame in 1983. He was inducted into the Virginia Sports Hall of Fame (the state-wide organization) in 2003.

Personal life

Oates was considering returning to managing when he was diagnosed with an aggressive brain tumor, glioblastoma multiforme. Doctors gave Oates only about a year to live, but he survived for over three years—enough time to attend his daughter's wedding, his grandchild's birth, and his induction into the Texas Rangers Hall of Fame at The Ballpark in Arlington. During the ceremony at The Ballpark, he was given a standing ovation as Oates, weakened by the cancer and its treatment, required the help of his wife Gloria and a cane to walk.

Oates succumbed to the tumor at age 58 at Virginia Commonwealth University Medical Center in Richmond on Christmas Eve 2004.

References

External links

  

Johnny Oates at (SABR Baseball BioProject)
Johnny Oates at Deadball Era

Virginia Tech Hall of Fame (1983 Inductees)
USA Today obituary

1946 births
2004 deaths
Atlanta Braves players
Baltimore Orioles coaches
Baltimore Orioles managers
Baltimore Orioles players
Baseball players from North Carolina
Bluefield Orioles players
Chicago Cubs coaches
Dallas–Fort Worth Spurs players
Deaths from brain cancer in the United States
Deaths from cancer in Virginia
Los Angeles Dodgers players
Major League Baseball bullpen coaches
Major League Baseball catchers
Major League Baseball first base coaches
Major League Baseball managers with retired numbers
Manager of the Year Award winners
Miami Marlins (FSL) players
Nashville Sounds managers
New York Yankees coaches
New York Yankees players
People from Sylva, North Carolina
Philadelphia Phillies players
Rochester Red Wings managers
Rochester Red Wings players
Texas Rangers managers
Virginia Tech Hokies baseball players
Baseball players from Richmond, Virginia